Gore is a town in south-western Ethiopia.

Gore is known for its honey. The map attached to C. W. Gwynn's account of his 1908/09 triangulation survey of southern Ethiopia shows that Gore had a telegraph station. During the 1960s experimental tea plantations were started around Gore, and a number of them thrived. The Gummaro plantation near Gore, with 800 hectares, is the largest tea plantation in Ethiopia.

The town is served by Gore Airport. Captain Esme Nourse Erskine, the British Consul at Gore (1928-1936), developed the aerodrome and produced “Flying Directions Kurmuk to Gore (1932).

History 
Gore was founded in the nineteenth century, growing up around Ras Tessema Nadew's palace. The Russian explorer Alexander Bulatovich stopped here 21 November 1896, expecting to meet Ras Tessema, who was away campaigning against the Mocha; Ras Tessema had not returned when Bulatovich left on 31 December. With the growing prosperity of the port town of Gambela, and the growth of the Baro River route to Sudan, Gore likewise prospered, holding two market days a week. Richard Pankhurst describes the pre-World War I community as having five foreign trading concerns -- "two Greek, one Syrian, one British and one German"—engaged in the export of coffee, wax, and to a lesser extent animal hides, and the import of cotton cloth, salt, and other manufactured goods. Civet cat oil was also a significant export at the time, Pankhurst noting that Ras Tessema exported 42 kilos in 1910.

On 9 July 1927, the Greek nationals T. Zewos and A. Donalis were awarded a contract to link the town and Gore by road with Gambela, a distance of 180 kilometers. However, the road from Jimma to Gore was not yet built by 1935. A trip to Addis Ababa took 20–22 days for pack mules and 14–15 days for riding mules. The mail transport from Gore to the capital departed every Monday at 17.00 while the government telephone line was used also as telegraph connection.

Erskine was the British Consul at Gore from 1928 to 1936. On arrival “Erskine set about building an impressive residency on a hill overlooking Gore, with outbuildings, barracks, and stables for ten special constables, and a pack of hounds” now a ruin. During the Italian invasion 1935-1936, Erskine helped the Western Galla Confederation with their application to League of Nations, in which the Galla (Oromo) chiefs asked “to be placed under a British mandate … until we achieve self government”. The British government declined to forward these applications to the League of Nations.

Later Ras Imru Haile Selassie attempted to use Gore as his base to resist the forces of the occupying Italian forces, but hostility from the local Welega Oromo forced him to move from the town late in October, 1936. On 26 November 1936, the Italian 1st Eritrean Brigade occupied the town.

After World War II, Gore served as the capital of Illubabor province, until 1978 when Metu became the capital.

Demographics 
Based on figures from the Central Statistical Agency in 2005, Gore has an estimated total population of 12,708 of whom 6,125 were males and 6,583 were females. The 1994 census reported this town had a total population of 7,114 of whom 3,322 were males and 3,792 were females. It is the largest settlement in the woreda of Ale.

Notes 

Cities and towns in Oromia Region